Zezé Di Camargo & Luciano are a famous Brazilian sertanejo/country duo. The two brothers were born in Pirenópolis, Goiás. Zezé is the artistic name for Mirosmar José de Camargo and Luciano the artistic name for Welson David de Camargo.

In 1991, their first LP exploded thanks to the hit single É o Amor, which was the year's most popular song and one of the most famous sertanejo songs ever. Their 1994 album featured a guest appearance from Willie Nelson on their version of "Always on My Mind", Eu só Penso Em Você. Until 2001, every album of the duo surpassed 1 million copies sold, including the 1995 one which sold over 2 million copies. In total, their releases from 1991 to 2000 sold 16 million copies. They are one of the best-selling sertanejo acts in Brazilian history, and beginning with their 1995 release, they began singing in Spanish as well. They also have the most lucrative recording deal in Brazilian industry with Sony BMG.

A Brazilian film made about the duo, 2 Filhos de Francisco, released in 2005, was the most successful Brazilian movie in 25 years.

Discography

Studio albums

Zezé Di Camargo & Luciano I (1991)
Zezé Di Camargo & Luciano II (1992)
Zezé Di Camargo & Luciano III (1993)
Zezé Di Camargo & Luciano IV (1994)
Camargo & Luciano (1994)
Zezé Di Camargo & Luciano V (1995)
Zezé Di Camargo & Luciano VI (1996)
Zezé Di Camargo & Luciano VII (1997)
Zezé Di Camargo & Luciano VIII (1998)
Zezé Di Camargo & Luciano IX (2000)
Zezé Di Camargo & Luciano X (2001)
Zezé Di Camargo & Luciano in Spanish (2001)
Zezé Di Camargo & Luciano XI (2002)
Zezé Di Camargo & Luciano XII (2003)
Zezé Di Camargo & Luciano XIII (2005)
 (2006)
Zezé Di Camargo & Luciano XIV (2008)
Double Face (2010)
Zezé Di Camargo & Luciano XV (2012)
Teorias de Raul (2014)
Dois Tempos (2016)
Dois Tempos - Parte 2 (2017)

Live albums
Ao Vivo (2000)
Ao Vivo (2001)
Ao Vivo na Estrada (2004)
Duas Horas de Sucesso - Ao Vivo (2009)
20 Anos de Sucesso (2012)
Flores em Vida - Ao Vivo (2015)

EPs
Teorias (2013)

Compilation
10 Anos de Sucesso (2001)
Dois Corações e Uma História Vol. 7 - Duetos & Raridades (2004)
Box 15 Anos De Sucesso (2006)
Raridades (2007)
20 Anos de Sucesso (2011)
Mega Hits (2014)
25 Anos de Sucesso (2016)

Movie
2 Filhos de Francisco – A História de Zezé Di Camargo & Luciano (2005)

See also

 List of best-selling albums in Brazil

References

External links
 
 
 Escuchar Música de Camargo y Luciano

Musical groups established in 1991
Family musical groups
Sertanejo music groups
Sertanejo musicians
Columbia Records artists
Latin Grammy Award winners
Brazilian musical duos
1991 establishments in Brazil
Spanish-language singers of Brazil